Dubăsarii Vechi is a village in Criuleni District, Moldova.

History
In 1908, Nicolae Donici established a private astronomical observatory in his village of Dubăsarii Vechi. The astronomical observatory in Dubăsarii Vechi directed by Donici enjoyed a number of  astronomers from everywhere: the German: Emanuel von der Pahlen, the Russian emigrants: Lev Ocoulitch and Andrei Baikov.

Notable people
 Nicolae Donici
 Haralambie Corbu
Iura Luncașu

Gallery

References

External links 
 Vocea Basarabiei, Satul Dubăsari Vechi a eternizat numele a două personalități științifice 
 EUROPA stamps from Moldova, Hungary and Germany

Villages of Criuleni District